William Willet (November 1, 1869 – March 29, 1921) was an American portrait painter, muralist, stained glass designer, studio owner and writer.  An early proponent of the Gothic Revival and active in the "Early School" of American stained glass, he founded the Willet Stained Glass and Decorating Company, a stained glass studio, with his wife and partner Anne Lee Willet, in protest against the opalescent pictorial windows which were the rage at the turn of the twentieth century.

Career

A descendant of Thomas Willett, the first English mayor of New York City, Willet was born on November 1, 1869 in New York.  He studied under the artist William Merritt Chase, at the Tradesmen's Institute in New York City and in France and England.  Originally a portrait painter, Willet made portraits for President William McKinley, John Jacob Aster, William McEwan, among others.  He assisted John La Farge between 1885–1887 during which time he served as art director and painted faces on murals.

In 1896 he married Anne Lee, daughter of the Reverend Henry F. Lee, of Philadelphia. In 1897 the couple moved to Pittsburgh, where Willet served as art director of stained glass artist Ludwig Grosse's stained glass firm from 1897–98, before establishing his own studio, the Willet Stained Glass Company, in 1899.

Inspired by European work and the Pre-Raphaelites, Willet rebelled against the American School of stained glass – a movement established by Louis Comfort Tiffany and John La Farge identified by its use of opalescent glass.  Willet believed that opalescent glass ignored the principles of architecture and did not fulfill the purpose of a window.  Instead, he was enamored with the medieval technique of transparent antique glass, lecturing and writing constantly on the subject.  As a member of what Charles J. Connick termed the "Early School" of stained glass artists, Willet, and fellow craftsmen Otto Heinigke and Harry E. Goodhue, are credited with renewing America's interest in traditional medieval materials, techniques, and aesthetic.

He is responsible for making the first medallion window in America, in the First Presbyterian Church of Pittsburgh, Pennsylvania and the second in Calvary Episcopal Church of Pittsburgh, Pennsylvania.  The first medallion window, designed and executed for First Presbyterian Church of Pittsburgh was composed of antique stained glass in the medieval manner.  It was ill favored by the Senior Pastor, Dr. Maitland Alexander, who found it archaic and cheap.  He ordered that the window be covered with heavy canvas and a great organ erected before it.  Before it was hidden from view, however, it caught the attention of Neo-Gothic architect Ralph Adams Cram who would later serve as a patron for many of the Willet's works.

In 1910 Willet won the commission for the Great Sanctuary Window in the Cadet Chapel at the United States Military Academy in West Point, New York.  That window, entitled Duty, Honor, Country is composed of seven lancets and measures 34 feet wide by 50 feet tall.  At the time, the competition was recognized as one of the most memorable ever held in the United States.  Designs submitted to the selection jury were displayed for several weeks at the Boston Museum of Fine Arts.  Willet beat out Louis Comfort Tiffany and many other accomplished designers of the day. Following its completion, the project for the design and fabrication of the Nave and North windows was awarded to the Willet studio. The commission, which spanned three generations of Willets over a period of sixty-six years, remains the longest continuing commission in American history.

Other windows Willet designed are those of Mather Memorial in Trinity Cathedral, Cleveland, Ohio; Cathedral of Saint Paul in Pittsburgh, Pennsylvania; Church of the Holy Spirit, Asbury Park, New York; Procter Hall at the Princeton University Graduate College, Princeton, New Jersey; World War Memorial Window in Trinity Episcopal Church, Syracuse, New York; windows in Green-Wood Cemetery Chapel, Brooklyn, New York; and the following windows in Philadelphia, Pennsylvania: Joseph Harrison Memorial, Church of the Holy Trinity, Philadelphia; Alfred Harrison Memorial, Calvary Protestant Episcopal Church, Germantown, Pennsylvania; St. Matthew's Catholic Church, Conshohocken, Pennsylvania.

Death

He died on March 29, 1921 at the age of 52.  Following his death his wife and partner, Anne Lee and their son Henry continued with the Willet Studio which today is recognized as Willet Hauser Architectural Glass.  He is buried in Princeton Cemetery in Princeton, New Jersey. At the time of his death, Willet was considered one of the most important stained glass artists in America.

Examples of William Willet's work in stained glass

See also

The Cadet Chapel, United States Military Academy
Corning Museum of Glass
Old First Reformed Church, Brooklyn, New York 
William Willet on askart.com
Willet Hauser Architectural Glass
Photos of Princeton University's Procter Hall
Description of the Great West Window, Procter Hall, Princeton University by William and Annie Lee Willet

References

American stained glass artists and manufacturers
19th-century American painters
19th-century American male artists
American male painters
20th-century American painters
Artists from Pittsburgh
American muralists
Burials at Princeton Cemetery
1921 deaths
1869 births
20th-century American male artists